The 12th Annual Interactive Achievement Awards is the 12th edition of the Interactive Achievement Awards, an annual awards event that honors the best games in the video game industry. It was also held as part of the Academy's 2009 D.I.C.E. Summit, and was hosted by Jay Mohr.

LittleBigPlanet received the most nominations and won the most awards, including Overall Game of the Year. Sony Computer Entertainment published the nominees and award winners.

Bruce Shelley received the of the Academy of Interactive Arts & Sciences Hall of Fame Award.

Winners and Nominees
Winners are listed first, highlighted in boldface, and indicated with a double dagger.

Special Awards

Hall of Fame
 Bruce Shelley

Games with multiple nominations and awards

The following 28 games received multiple nominations:

The following four games received multiple awards:

Companies with multiple nominations

Companies that received multiple nominations as either a developer or a publisher.

Companies that received multiple awards as either a developer or a publisher.

External links

References

2009 awards
2009 awards in the United States
February 2009 events in the United States
2008 in video gaming
D.I.C.E. Award ceremonies